The 2003 Euro-Asia Masters Challenge – Event 2 was an invitational professional non-ranking snooker held in Thailand in August 2003.

Following on from the first leg played immediately before it, this edition also featured the same format of eight players in two groups of four. Ken Doherty defeated Marco Fu 5–2 in the final to win the £30,000 prize.

Results

Round-robin stage
Group A

Results:
 Mark Williams  2–0 Stephen Hendry
 Ding Junhui 2–0 Marco Fu
 Ding Junhui 2–0 Mark Williams
 Marco Fu 2–0 Mark Williams
 Stephen Hendry 2–0 Ding Junhui
 Marco Fu 2–1 Stephen Hendry

Group B

Results:
 Jimmy White 2–0 James Wattana
 James Wattana 2–0 Shokat Ali
 Ken Doherty 2–0 James Wattana
 Shokat Ali 2–0 Ken Doherty
 Jimmy White 2–1 Shokat Ali
 Ken Doherty 2–1 Jimmy White

Knock-out stage

References

Euro-Asia Masters Challenge
2003 in Thai sport
2003 in snooker